Hörður Magnússon  (born 19 February 1966) is an Icelandic former footballer who played as a forward. He was part of the Iceland national team between 1990 and 1993. He played nine matches, scoring one goal.

He became Úrvalsdeild top scorer in 1989, 1990 and 1991.

Personal life
Hörður is the son of Icelandic actor and comedian Magnús Ólafsson and cousin of actor Stefán Karl Stefánsson.

References

External links
 
 Iceland Top Scorers
 
 Euro 2016
 USMNT Results: 1990-1994

Living people
1966 births
Association football forwards
Hordur Magnusson
Hordur Magnusson
Hordur Magnusson
Hordur Magnusson
Hordur Magnusson
Hordur Magnusson